The Council elections held in Wolverhampton on Thursday 5 May 1983 were one third, and 20 of the 60 seats were up for election.

During the 1983 election the Conservatives gained the Bushbury seat from Labour whilst Labour gained the Wednesfield South from the Conservatives, leaving the overall constitution unchanged and Labour as the controlling group. 

Prior to the election the constitution of the Council was:

Labour 34
Conservative 26

Following the election the constitution of the Council was:

Labour 34
Conservative 26

Election result

1983
1983 English local elections
1980s in the West Midlands (county)